Dehm is a surname of German origin; people having the surname include:

 Diether Dehm (full name Jörg-Diether Wilhelm Dehm-Desoi; born 3 April 1950), German singer-songwriter, music producer and left-wing politician
 Jannik Dehm (born 2 May 1996), German professional footballer
 Patrick Dehm (born 1962), German Catholic theologian, supervisor and clinical Gestalt therapist

Surnames from given names